The 1997 Big Ten Conference baseball tournament was held at Ray Fisher Stadium on the campus of the University of Michigan in Ann Arbor, Michigan, from May 15 through 19. The top four teams from the regular season participated in the double-elimination tournament, the seventeenth annual tournament sponsored by the Big Ten Conference to determine the league champion.  won their fourth tournament championship and earned the Big Ten Conference's automatic bid to the 1997 NCAA Division I baseball tournament.

Format and seeding 
The 1997 tournament was a 4-team double-elimination tournament, with seeds determined by conference regular season winning percentage only.

Tournament

All-Tournament Team 
The following players were named to the All-Tournament Team.

Most Outstanding Player 
Mike Lockwood was named Most Outstanding Player. Lockwood was an outfielder for Ohio State.

References 

Tournament
Big Ten baseball tournament
Big Ten Baseball Tournament
Big Ten baseball tournament
Sports in Ann Arbor, Michigan